Charlotte Thiele (6 June 1918 – 6 May 2004) was a German actress.

Career
Thiele was blacklisted in 1944 after spurning the advances of Dr. Joseph Goebbels, having allegedly thrown his gift into the trash. She and her second husband, Croatian diplomat Branko Buzjak, fled to Argentina shortly thereafter. She returned to Germany in 1954 and attempted to revive her career, but was unsuccessful.

Filmography
 Wochenendfriede (1938, Short) as Karla Berghoff
 We Danced Around the World (1939) as Captain-Girl Norma
 A Man Astray (1940) as Ingrid Pattersson
 Ich klage an (1941) as Dr. Barbara Burckhardt
 Titanic (1943) as Lady Astor
  (1944) as Fanny Köhler

Television
 Rheingold Theatre, 1 episode "The Last Tour" (1956), as Julia Stahl

References

Bibliography

External links
 
 Charlotte Thiele at filmportal.de

1918 births
2004 deaths
German actresses
Actresses from Berlin
German emigrants to Argentina